Favale di Malvaro is a comune (municipality) in the Metropolitan City of Genoa in the Italian region Liguria, located about  east of Genoa.

Favale di Malvaro borders the following municipalities: Lorsica, Mocònesi, Neirone, Rezzoaglio.

References

Cities and towns in Liguria